Tenudam-cum-Kathara is a census town in the Gomia CD block in the Bermo subdivision of the Bokaro district in the Indian state of Jharkhand.

Geography

Location

Teundam-cum-Kathara is not marked in Google maps. The location given here is as per the Map of Gomia CD block on page 78 of District Census Handbook 2011, Bokaro.

Area overview
Bokaro district consists of undulating uplands on the Chota Nagpur Plateau with the Damodar River cutting a valley right across. The East Bokaro Coalfield located in the Bermo-Phusro area and small intrusions of Jharia Coalfield make Bokaro a coal rich district. In 1965, one of the largest steel manufacturing units in the country, Bokaro Steel Plant, operated by Steel Authority of India Limited, was set-up at Bokaro Steel City. The Damodar Valley Corporation established its first thermal power station at Bokaro (Thermal). The soil is generally infertile and agriculture is mostly rain-fed.

Note: The map alongside presents some of the notable locations in the district. All places marked in the map are linked in the larger full screen map.

Tenughat Dam
Tenughat Dam, earthfill dam with masonry-cum-concret==e spillway, was constructed across the Damodar River and inaugurated in 1973. It was constructed by the Government of Bihar, outside the scope of Damodar Valley Corporation. It supplies water to the Bokaro industrial area.

Demographics
According to the 2011 Census of India, Tenudam-cum-Kathara had a total population of 22,080, of which 11,538 (52%) were males and 10,542 (48%) were females. Population in the age range 0–6 years was 3,160. The total number of literate persons in Tenudam-cum-Kathara was 13,798 (72.93% of the population over 6 years).

 India census, Tenudam-cum- Kathara had a population of 20,443. Males constitute 53% of the population and females 47%. Tenu Dam-cum- Kathhara has an average literacy rate of 56%, lower than the national average of 59.5%: male literacy is 68%, and female literacy is 43%. In Tenu Dam-cum- Kathhara, 19% of the population is under 6 years of age.

Infrastructure
According to the District Census Handbook 2011, Bokaro, Tenudam-cum-Kathara  covered an area of 20.17 km2. Among the civic amenities, it had 79 km roads with open drains, the protected water supply involved tapwater from treated sources, overhead tank. It had 3,636 domestic electric connections, 40 road lighting points. Among the medical facilities, it had 2 hospitals, 2 dispensaries, 2 health centres, 10 family welfare centres, 6 maternity and child welfare centres, 1 nursing home, 3 medicine shops. Among the educational facilities it had 21 primary schools, 10 middle schools, 7 secondary school,  2 senior secondary schools, 1  general degree college. It had 2 non-formal educational centres (Sarva Siksha Abhiyan). An important commodity it produced was coal. It had the branch office of 1 nationalised bank.

Administration
Tenudam-cum Kathara  is one of the 16 urban local bodies in Bokaro district. It has a town panchayat.

Economy

Kathara Area of Central Coalfields Limited operates the following collieries in East Bokaro Coalfield: Kathara OC, Jarangdih OC, Jarangdih UG, Swang OC, Swang UG and Govindpur UG.

CCL operates coking coal washeries at Kathara and Swang.

References

Cities and towns in Bokaro district